Phillip Norman (born August 22, 1995) is a professional gridiron football offensive lineman for the BC Lions of the Canadian Football League (CFL).

College career
After using a redshirt season in 2013, Norman played college football for the Bethune-Cookman Wildcats from 2014 to 2017. He played in 40 games over four years, including 11 starts at tackle in his senior year.

Professional career
Norman signed with the BC Lions on May 9, 2018. At the conclusion of training camp, he was signed to the team's practice roster to begin the 2018 season, where he spent the entire year. 

In 2019, he began the season on the practice roster for the first five games, but made his professional debut on July 20, 2019, against the Saskatchewan Roughriders where he started at center. He played and started in the final 13 games of the regular season, including 11 starts at center. He did not play in 2020 due to the cancellation of the 2020 CFL season.

As a pending free agent, Norman re-signed with the Lions on January 14, 2021. However, he was released following training camp on July 26, 2021. He re-signed with the team on September 2, 2021, and spent time on the practice roster before starting the final game of the regular season at left tackle. Norman re-signed with the Lions on December 30, 2021. He made the team's opening day roster for 2022 as the starting left guard.

References

External links
 BC Lions bio

1995 births
Living people
American football offensive linemen
BC Lions players
Bethune–Cookman Wildcats football players
Canadian football offensive linemen
People from Sebastian, Florida
Players of American football from Florida
Players of Canadian football from Florida